Rubén Rocha Moya (born 15 June 1949) is a Mexican politician and educator who has served as the Governor of Sinaloa since 2021. A member of the National Regeneration Movement (MORENA), Rocha previously served in the Senate of Mexico from 2018 to 2021.

Rocha was previously been the rector of the Universidad Autónoma de Sinaloa (UAS) in the 1990s and a former state deputy and gubernatorial candidate.

Early life
Rocha Moya was born in Batequitas, a locality in Badiraguato, as one of six children and obtained his degree as a mathematics teacher from the Escuela Normal Superior de Oaxaca. However, it was his time at a rural teacher's school in Sonora that would introduce him to left-wing thought; he rose through the ranks and served as the secretary general of the Federation of Rural Socialist Students from 1968 to 1969. In his first job, as a teacher in Ciudad Obregón, Sonora, Rocha joined the Mexican Communist Party.

In 1972, Rocha returned to his home state and became a physics and mathematics teacher at the preparatory school in Guamúchil, where he became the head of the campus. The next year, Rocha was successful in affiliating the institution with the Universidad Autónoma de Sinaloa. He would remain in Guamúchil until 1980, when he was offered a position as press secretary for the university's teachers' union; during this time, he successfully helped fight attempts by Governor Antonio Toledo Corro to remove the preparatory schools from the UAS system. In 1983, Rocha was named the union's secretary general.

Political career

First legislative position and UAS rectorship
As a result of his ascendancy in the UAS union, Rocha was named to the party list of deputies to the state legislature for the Unified Socialist Party of Mexico, becoming part of the state's first group of leftist legislators. After the three-year term ended in 1986, Rocha Moya was a gubernatorial candidate for the leftist Movimiento Popular Sinaloense party and then took a break to pursue his master's degree at the Universidad Autónoma de Querétaro.

Rocha returned to Sinaloa in 1989 at the invitation of David Moreno Lizárraga, the newly elected UAS rector, to serve as his secretary general, the second-highest leadership position. This set Rocha up to be elected four years later as rector, serving until 1997. During his tenure, the university began offering its first doctorate degree, constructed new sports facilities and connected its campuses in Culiacán, Los Mochis and Mazatlán by fiber-optic link.

After the UAS: second gubernatorial bid

A year after the end of his rectorship, Rocha made a second bid for governor of Sinaloa in 1998, this time as the candidate of the Party of the Democratic Revolution (PRD). Rocha finished third, while the PRD obtained its best result in the state to date, winning one mayoral race and five seats in the legislature. After the election, Rocha became a PRD member, and one internal faction proposed him as the head of the state party; other officials, seeing Rocha as a threat to their careers, blocked him from running, which led the national party organization to sanction the state committee and to his resignation from the PRD in 2002.

From 2005 to 2010, Rocha served as the coordinator of advisors to Institutional Revolutionary Party governor Jesús Vizcarra Calderón. Despite the connection to a PRI official, Rocha noted that he never stopped supporting leftist candidates and never became a PRI member.

In 2013, due to his PRI connections, Rocha was named the deputy director of training at the Institute for Social Security and Services for State Workers (ISSSTE). He served in that position until governor Quirino Ordaz Coppel asked him to serve as an adviser again, even though Rocha had become a member of MORENA, having known Andrés Manuel López Obrador since his time in the PRD.

Senate
In 2018, Rocha Moya ran for elected office for the first time in two decades. The Senate ticket of Rocha and Imelda Castro Castro, for the Juntos Haremos Historia alliance, received more than 604,000 votes—nearly twice the second-place finishers—and both candidates won election.

In the LXIV Legislature, Rocha served on five commissions and was president of the Education Commission. During his presidency, the Senate approved a new General Law of Higher Education, requiring the Mexican state to ensure free access to the higher education system beginning in 2022.

In 2020, while a senator, he obtained a law degree from the National Autonomous University of Mexico.

2021 gubernatorial campaign

In March 2021, MORENA named Rocha Moya as its gubernatorial candidate for Sinaloa; he had been tabbed as a potential candidate for months, though rumors circulated that he would be offered the position of Secretary of Public Education. He took leave from the Senate, where his alternate, Raúl de Jesús Elenes Angulo, was sworn in. He was also named the candidate of the state-level Sinaloa Party (PAS), even though even Rocha Moya and López Obrador had questioned the Morena-PAS alliance.

Polling before the election showed a close race with Va por México coalition candidate Mario Zamora Gastélum. However, quick count results on election night showed the race to have been far less competitive, with Rocha Moya obtaining 55 percent of the vote.

Personal life
In 1973, Rocha married Socorro Ruiz Carrasco, with whom he had four children; Ruiz died in 2014.

References

Living people
1949 births
Governors of Sinaloa
Politicians from Sinaloa
Mexican educators
Members of the Senate of the Republic (Mexico) for Sinaloa
Morena (political party) politicians
Autonomous University of Queretaro alumni
Autonomous University of Sinaloa alumni
Heads of universities and colleges in Mexico
Members of the Congress of Sinaloa
20th-century Mexican politicians
21st-century Mexican politicians
Senators of the LXIV and LXV Legislatures of Mexico